Dromius piceus is a species of beetle in the family Carabidae. It is found in Canada and the United States.

References

Further reading

 
 
 

Harpalinae
Beetles described in 1831
Taxa named by Pierre François Marie Auguste Dejean